Zahid Bassarath (born 11 May 1983) is a Trinidad and Tobago cricket umpire. He has stood in domestic matches in the 2016–17 Regional Four Day Competition and was the onfield umpire for the Women's One Day Internationals between the West Indies and Sri Lanka in October 2017.

References

External links
 

1983 births
Living people
Trinidad and Tobago cricket umpires
Place of birth missing (living people)